Sanglap Kolkata or Sanglap theatre group is a Kolkata based Bengali theatre group. The theatre group was founded in 1979. The group's first production was "Ispat" based on Nikolai Ostrovsky's novel "How the Steel Was Tempered".

Productions
Full-length plays
Amol Syndrome(2014)
Ratnakar
Lathi Kando  (2008, based on a novel of Shirshendu Mukhopadhyay)
Aborton  (2007)
Astarag (2006)
Ferari Fouz (2005)
Bhavam Chaleche Juddehy (2004)
Hai raam (2002)
Kaalchakra (2000)
Sudrayana (1998)
Ghare Phera (1994, based on Home Coming by Harold Pinter)
Disha (1993, based on Volga Theke Ganga by Rahul Sankrityayan)

One act plays
Bidhi-O-Betikram (based on Bertolt Brecht).
Tarasher Bhar
Rather Rashi (written by Rabindranath Tagore).
Jagaran
Aayna
Prastab
Padma-Ghokro

Awards
1993: Disha won "Best production of the year" award from Drama Academy of India.
1994: Ghare Phera "Best actress" award from Drama Academy of India.
1998: Sudrayan "Best script and best choreography" award from Paschim Banga Natya Akademi

Sanglap Natyotsab
Since 1993, the Sanglap theatre group is organizing theatre festival every year during January–February which is known as Sanglap Natyotsab. Eminent theatre groups from Kolkata, West Bengal, Bangladesh etc. participate in this theatre festival.

References

External links

Theatre companies in India
Culture of Kolkata
Bengali theatre groups